A national emergency is a situation in which a government is empowered to perform actions not normally permitted. The 1976 National Emergencies Act implemented various legal requirements regarding emergencies declared by the President of the United States.

As of April 2022, 79 emergencies have been declared; 37 have expired and another 42 are currently in effect, each having been renewed annually by the president.

See also
 Report of the Special Committee on the Termination of the National Emergency

References

United States federal legislation
History of the government of the United States
Lists of United States legislation
United States history-related lists
United States federal defense and national security legislation
Emergency laws in the United States
Economic warfare
Continuity of government in the United States
United States foreign relations legislation
United States federal trade legislation
Presidency of the United States